Club Deportivo Palencia Balompié was a Spanish football team based in Palencia, in the autonomous community of Castile and León. Founded in 2011, it played in Segunda División B, holding home games at La Balastera, with a capacity of 8,070 seats.

History
CD Palencia Balompié was founded in 2011 by a group of supporters who disagreed about the conversion of CF Palencia into a Sociedad Anónima Deportiva. It took the name of Club Deportivo Palencia from the first club of the city, which was founded in 1929.

On 21 June 2014, Palencia promoted to Tercera División thanks to the promotion of Atlético Astorga and Valladolid B to Segunda División B.

In its first season in Tercera División, Palencia finished in the third position, qualifying for the promotion play-offs to Segunda División B. Just in the next season, the club achieved the promotion to the third tier by beating Loja, SD Logroñés and Deportivo Aragón in the promotion play-offs.

The season in Segunda División B Group 1 was very controversial as the board of directors tried to transform the club into a Sociedad Anónima Deportiva, despite the opposition of the supporters of the club and despite being forbidden in the club's bylaws. However, a judicial statement stopped any try of conversion. The team also garnered some attention at the unveiling of their season kits, which had an unorthodox design displaying the human muscular system.

Finally, Palencia could not remain in Segunda División after finishing in the 18th position, and was demoted to Regional Aficionados due to unpaid debts to their players.

On 9 September 2017, the club did not play its first league game due to not having enough members in the team. After ending normally the season, Palencia would not register in any competition for the 2018–19 season.

Season to season

1 season in Segunda División B
3 seasons in Tercera División

Detailed list of seasons

Current squad

See also
 Palencia CF (I)
 CF Palencia
 Palencia CF

References

External links
Official website  
Futbolme team profile 

Football clubs in Castile and León
Association football clubs established in 2011
2011 establishments in Spain
Sport in Palencia